Joseph Lalfakzuala (born 16 August 1995) is an Indian professional footballer who plays as a central midfielder for Shillong Lajong in the I-League.

Career
Born in Mizoram, Lalfakzuala started his career in Mizoram with Chanmari before joining the AIFF Elite Academy. After spending some time with the Elite Academy, Lalfakzuala signed with Shillong Lajong of the I-League.

He made his professional debut with the club on 29 December 2014 in the Federation Cup against Pune. He came on as a 78th-minute substitute for Jacob Lalrawngbawla as Shillong Lajong lost the match 1–3.

International
Lalfakzuala has represented India at the under-19 level and was selected for the team that played in the AFC U-19 Championship qualifiers in 2013 but did not make any appearances.

Career statistics

References

External links 
 All India Football Federation Profile.

1995 births
Living people
Indian footballers
Shillong Lajong FC players
Association football midfielders
Footballers from Mizoram
India youth international footballers